Paul Oosterbaan (born September 8, 1995) is an American professional tennis player.

A native of Kalamazoo, Oosterbaan comes from a sporting family. His father, JP Oosterbaan, won an NCAA national championship in basketball for the University of Michigan. Two siblings, Lizzie and Teddy, have both played Division I collegiate tennis. He is also a relative of college football player Bennie Oosterbaan.

Oosterbaan partnered with Ronnie Schneider to win the doubles title at the USTA national championships (18s) in 2013, which earned them a wildcard spot to the US Open main draw. They were beaten in the first round of the US Open by Brian Baker and Rajeev Ram. The following year he began playing collegiate tennis for the University of Georgia.

ITF Futures finals

Singles: 1 (0–1)

Doubles: 4 (0–4)

References

External links
 
 

1995 births
Living people
American male tennis players
Georgia Bulldogs tennis players
Tennis people from Michigan
Sportspeople from Kalamazoo, Michigan